Privolzhsky City District (İdel buye rayonı) is a city district of Kazan, the capital of the Republic of Tatarstan, Russia. It occupies the southern part of Kazan. Population: 

It has a common administration with Vakhitovsky City District.

The district has borders with Laishevsky District to the south, Pestrechinsky District to the south-east, Sovetsky City District to the north-east, Vakhitovsky City District to the north-west and Verkhneuslonsky District to the west (through Volga).

History 
In 1918 Zheleznodorozhny and Pletenyovski districts were created as party-territorial units.

In 1919, the first of them was renamed Zabulachny (Bolaq aryağı); in 1920 both district were merged into Zabulachno-Pletenyovski District (Jaꞑalif Bolaq arjaƣь-Pelətən rajunь).

In 1926 the district's name was changed to Nizhne-Gorodskoy, and in 1931 to Stalinsky.

District leadership 
First secretaries of District Party Committee:

 Anna Blusevich (1918–1919)
 Romashev (1919)
 Arnolds Strautmanis (1919–1921)
 Vasily Kalchenko (1921–1923)
 Pyotr Knyazev (1923–1924)
 Andrey Terskiy (1924)
 Aleksandr Kleymyonov (1924–1925)
 Mikhail Prusakov (1925–1927)
 Qıyam Abramof (1927–1928)
 Möxetdinef (1928–1929)
 Ğömär Älmöxämmätef (1929–1930)
 Bäker Şakirof (1930–1931)
 Nikolay Antsishikin (1931–1932)
 Mostafa Mäñgişef (1932–1933)
 Xäybik Sibğätullin (1933–1935)
 Ğabdulla Yunısof (1935)
 Solomon Ioffe (1935–1936)
 Yaqup İslamof (1937)
 Vasily Fomichyov (1937)
 Cäläl Ğilmetdinef (1937–1938)
 Nikolay Zaytsev (1938–1940)
 Äfzaletdin Ğayazetdinef (1940–1941)
 Dmitry Tyshkevich (1941–1942)
 Anastasiya Garast (1942–1944)
 Porfiriy Ustinov (1944–1951)
 Aleksandra Pyatakova (1951–1955)
 Salix Minüşef (1955–1957)
 Nikolay Malinkin (1957–1961)
 Aleksandr Bondarenko (1961–1962)
 Yünir Cämaletdinef (1962–1966)
 İldus Sadıyqof (1966–1970)
 Ğömär Yosıpof (1970–1973)
 İldus Ğälief (1973–1980)
 Revo Hidiätullin (1980–1983)
 Valery Plastinin (1983–1984)
 Olga Yermakova (1984–1991)

References 

Kazan